The three Persian religions, as a medieval Chinese concept, referred to a group of Iranian religions that spread to Tang China. They were recognized and protected under Tang rule, helping them to prosper in China at a time when Sassanid Iran was falling to the early Muslim conquests. The three religious movements identified by the term were Zoroastrianism, the Persian Church, and Manichaeism.

Background 
The "three Persian religions" include:
 Zoroastrianism
 Christian Church of the East
 Manichaeism

Zoroastrianism was first introduced to China in the early North and South Dynasties, while Christianity and Manichaeism were both introduced to the Central Plains during the Tang Dynasty. The second Tang emperor, Taizong Li Shimin, led an attack on the King of Gaochang, Koji Wentai, in the 13th year of the Zhenguan era (639). Thereafter, the Tang Dynasty reached its peak of prosperity until the reign of Emperor Xuanzong Kaiyuan, when an enlightened system and tolerance of religion opened the door to the spread of different cultures. The international capital of Chang'an, with a population of more than one million, was full of exoticism, with a strong Hu culture. Indian illusionists, Persian dancers, singers, musicians, harem girls, and exotic cuisine could be found in the streets, and polo was a popular activity at the court, where noble women also enjoyed horseback riding. Against this backdrop, the Tang Dynasty was naturally the best period for the spread of the three Persian religions.

However, the three Persian religions were also hit during the 9th century Tang Wuzong Huichang Persecution of Buddhism, and has gradually withdrawn from the stage of Chinese history. However, their influence is still looming in different periods. In particular, Manichaeism was transferred to the folk secrets in the later period, blending with Buddhism, Taoism, and folk beliefs. The "Xiapu Manuscript" of Fujian Province discovered in 2008 was probably written at the time of the Ming Dynasty. Nowadays, there are special masters in Xiapu County to keep these Ming-style ritual books (that is, books on mantras and religious rituals) shows that Xiapu Manichaeanism has been transformed into a new form and has been passed down as a Chinese folk belief.

Overview

Zoroastrianism 

Zoroastrianism, which originated in Persia, and was the state religion of the Achaemenid Empire and the Sassanid Empire. Chen Yuan, in his book "The Introduction of Fire Zoroastrianism to China," argues that Zoroastrianism first became known in China during the Southern Liang period of the Northern Wei Dynasty, in the early 6th century A.D. The god Hu Tian, worshipped by Empress Ling of the Northern Wei Dynasty, was the god Ahura Mazda; Lin Wush believes that Zoroastrianism was introduced to China in the middle of the 5th century; and Rong Xinjiang, after examining various documents, believes that it was introduced to China in the early 4th century. Unlike other religions, which generally call their temples "temples," Zoroastrianism calls its temples "shrines". Zoroastrianism also differs from other religions in that its followers did not preach in China, nor did they translate scriptures, so only the Hu people, not the Han, followed. According to the unearthed epitaph of the Sogdian, there was a "Sabao" (also known as "Sabao") official position in the Sui and Tang Dynasties. Served for Sogdian Zoroastrians, specializing in the management of the Western Hu people living in the Central Plains and their religious activities. This teaching was especially prevalent among the Hua Sogdians. In Dunhuang during the five dynasties of the Tang Dynasty, there was a competition held by Sogdians. During the period when Wuzong Wuzong of the Tang Dynasty persecuted Buddhism, Zoroastrianism was also hit and disappeared in China after the Song Dynasty. Today's Zoroastrian art in China can mainly be unearthed from Sogdian Tombs.

Christianity 

Jingjiao is the name given to the Eastern Christian Church after it was introduced to China. Since its seat was located in the Sassanid Empire of Persia, it was called the Great Qin Church and the Persian Scripture Church when it first entered the Tang Empire, and was eventually named in Chinese Jingjiao. According to the Daqin Jinghuism Popular China Tablet, in the ninth year of Emperor Taizong's reign (635), a great deity of Daqin, Alopen, came to Chang'an with a statue of the scriptures, and Emperor Taizong sent his chancellor, Fang Xuanling, to the western suburbs to welcome the guest inside. After examining the teachings, Emperor Taizong ordered the construction of a Daqin temple in Yiningfang, which was also known as the Jing religion temple, and began the translation of the scriptures with the help of Fang Xuanling and Wei Zheng. Thereafter, Jingism developed smoothly in China for 150 years, and at one time, "the Dharma flowed through ten provinces and the temples filled a hundred cities". According to the Dzogchen, the Persian monk Jingjing translated 35 Jing sutras into Chinese in the 8th century AD. It was not until Emperor Wu Zong of the Tang Dynasty initiated the persecution of Buddhism in Huichang that the Jing religion fell victim and declined rapidly. The second major expansion of the religion into China was not until after the establishment of the Yuan Dynasty, but it died out again during the Ming Dynasty. There are few artworks of the Jing religion left behind, but there are now paintings of Christ in the Zangjing cave and murals in the Jing temple in Gaochang. In addition, there are tombstones with engravings and decorations by Christians, and bronze medallions (bronze crosses and other shaped robes and decorations).

Manichaeism 

Manichaeism is a Gnostic religion that originated in the territory of Sassanian Empire. It was created by the Persian Mani in the 3rd century AD and has always been regarded as a door of Christian heresy According to "The Buddhist history", In the first year of Wu Zetian's reign (694), the Persian Fudodan came to the dynasty with Manichean scriptures. The status of women in Manichaeism is very high, and Wu Zetian may have a good impression of them and treat Manichaeism preferentially. Later, the translated book "Manichaean Compendium" was banned by Emperor Xuanzong of Tang Dynasty because it borrowed a lot of Buddhist terminology and was judged to be "an evil opinion and a false claim of Buddhism that could confuse the people. After the An Lushan Rebellion, Uyghur Khanate established Manichaeism as the state religion. Relying on the political strength of the Uighurs, the religion began to spread widely in the Central Plains, and a Manichaean monastery, the Great Cloud Temple of Light, was established. It was not until the persecution of Buddhism by Emperor Wuzong of the Tang Dynasty in Huichang that Manichaeism was also banned. The religion then moved to the coastal areas of southern China, such as Fujian and Zhejiang, where it was secretly spread among the people and gradually combined with other religions, and remained intact through the Five Dynasties, Song and Yuan. After the Song Dynasty, the religion was renamed Mingism, and was denounced by the rulers of the time as a "vegetable-eating devil". "The reason for this is that Manichaeism rejects meat and vegetables, but its followers do not eat only vegetables; for them, fruits and vegetables are the most desirable food. The term "serving the devil" is a derogatory term used by those who are hostile to Manichaeism, saying that it serves demons. But in fact, the practice of Manichaeism is very strict. In addition to insisting on vegetarianism, Chen Yuan also pointed out that "Manichaeism is extremely strict with itself, extremely forgiving with others, extremely disciplined with itself, extremely fair with money, and no less than a moral religion. Thus, the religion was quite popular among the people. Manichaeism also attaches great importance to the juxtaposition of scriptures and pictures In the way of missions, the leader Mani not only wrote Seven Canons, but also drew Arzhang by himself. Manichaean artwork, such as manuscript illustrations, painted streamers, wall paintings, and silk scrolls, are brightly colored, gorgeous and dazzling.

Supplement 

In addition to the Persian religions, Islam also spread to China during the Tang Dynasty. According to Chinese Muslim tradition, Muhammad's uncle Sa'd ibn Abi Waqqas was sent to China to meet Tang Gaozong, located in Guangzhou Tang Dynasty The construction of Huaisheng Mosque is related to him.

See also 

 Zoroastrianism-related articles
 Xianshenlou
 Sogdian Daēnās

 Christianity-related articles
 Painting of a Christian figure
 Murals from the Christian temple at Qocho
 Nestorian Cross

 Manichaeism-related articles
 Manichaean art
 Cao'an Manichae Temple

Further reading

References 

Manichaean texts
Tang dynasty culture
Religion in China
Zoroastrianism
Chinese Manichaeism
Foreign relations of the Tang dynasty